Tikkun is a 2015 Israeli film directed by . The film explores the struggles of a young Hasidic man who questions his faith.

Plot 
Haim-Aron, a young Hasidic student, feels detached from his religious way of life. Following a near death experience, the young man faces an intense spiritual crisis and finds himself at odds with the Hasidic religious faith.

Awards 
 Best Feature Film, Best Cinematography, Best Script and Best Actor awards at the Jerusalem Film Festival
 Silver Leopard Prize at the 2015 Locarno Film Festival

See also
Tikkun olam, a concept in Judaism

References 

Films about Orthodox and Hasidic Jews